Chaplin is an underground light rail transit (LRT) station under construction on Line 5 Eglinton, a new line that is part of the Toronto subway system. It will be located in the Forest Hill neighbourhood at the intersection of Chaplin Crescent and Eglinton Avenue, and is scheduled to open in 2023.

Three entrances are planned for this underground station: a main entry at Gilgorm Road and Eglinton, next to Chaplin Parkette and replacing a retail building; a second entrance on the south side of Eglinton between Chaplin Crescent and the Kay Gardner Beltline Park; and a third, also on the south side, about halfway between Chaplin and Russel Hill road. The TTC 14 Glencairn bus route will connect at this station.

Destinations include Forest Hill Collegiate Institute, Forest Hill Library, the Beltline Trail, Memorial Park, and the Forest Hill Memorial Arena.

Construction
Property at 574 Eglinton Avenue West was expropriated for the construction of the main Chaplin station entrance.

In order to accommodate the third entrance, fire station 135 located at 641 Eglinton Avenue West was closed and its eastern portion demolished. The western portion has been retained. The fire hall was built in 1932, and is listed on the City of Toronto Inventory of Heritage Properties. A replacement fire station was established on the west side of Chaplin Crescent just north of Eglinton Avenue West.

By September 2021, electrical and communications systems had been installed and were ready for use between Caledonia and Chaplin stations, although vehicle testing there would be conducted later in 2021.

Surface connections 

, the following are the proposed connecting routes that would serve this station when Line 5 Eglinton opens:

References

External links
Chaplin station project page at the Eglinton Crosstown website.
Chaplin station open house: Metrolinx slide show for local residents.

Line 5 Eglinton stations